Oscar Wilde was an Irish playwright, novelist, poet, and author of short stories.

Oscar Wilde may also refer to:

Film 
 Oscar Wilde (film), a 1960 biographical film

Plays 
 Oscar Wilde (play), a 1936 English play

Bookshops 
 Oscar Wilde Bookshop, a bookstore devoted to gay and lesbian authors

Transport 
 MV Oscar Wilde, a cruise ferry

See also
 Wilde (film), a 1997 biographical film about Oscar Wilde
 The Trials of Oscar Wilde, a 1960 British film
 Wilde Oscar (born 1967), pornographic actor